Taibaiella smilacinae is a Gram-negative, rod-shaped, strictly aerobic and non-motile bacterium from the genus of Taibaiella which has been isolated from the stem of the plant Smilacina japonica from Shaanxi in China.

References

External links
Type strain of Taibaiella smilacinae at BacDive -  the Bacterial Diversity Metadatabase

Chitinophagia
Bacteria described in 2013